Sango Xamlashe (born 22 October 1998) is a South African rugby union player for the  in the Currie Cup. His regular position is centre.

Xamlashe was named in the  squad for the 2021 Currie Cup Premier Division.

References

South African rugby union players
Living people
Rugby union centres
Blue Bulls players
1998 births
Free State Cheetahs players
Griquas (rugby union) players
Rugby union players from the Eastern Cape
Lions (United Rugby Championship) players